A butterfly clutch is a device that attaches to the back of a tack pin to secure an accessory to clothing.

Butterfly clutches are used for various kind of brooches, badges, and medals. They are less secure compared to other types of pins such as prongs and safety pins, especially when the surface of the medium to which they go through is thick (e.g. wool) or when the accessory to which clutches are applied is too heavy (e.g. military order). Butterfly clutches are sometimes known as dammits, especially in military circles, after the phrase one says when one belonging to an important badge or medal is lost.

References

Jewellery components
Fasteners